The 1972 Summer Olympics, officially known as the Games of the XX Olympiad, took place in Munich, West Germany, from 26 August through 11 September 1972.  A total of 7,134 athletes from 121 National Olympic Committees (NOCs) competed in 195 events from 23 sports.

Men's indoor handball, slalom canoeing and kayaking all made their Olympic debuts, while archery returned to the Olympic program after a 52-year hiatus.  Rhodesia, like South Africa, was still segregated in 1972 and yet the International Olympic Committee (IOC) voted to invite Rhodesia to the 1972 Games. Eventually, African nations protested this invitation and threatened to boycott the Games.  Three days before the opening ceremonies the IOC voted to rescind their invitation and exclude the Rhodesian athletes.

The Games were largely overshadowed by what has come to be known as the Munich massacre. On September 5 a group of eight Palestinian terrorists belonging to the Black September Organization broke into the Olympic Village and took nine Israeli athletes, coaches and officials hostage in their apartments. Two of the hostages who resisted were killed in the first moments of the break-in; the subsequent standoff in the Olympic Village lasted for almost 18 hours. Late in the evening of September 5, the terrorists and their hostages were transferred by helicopter to the military airport of Fürstenfeldbruck, ostensibly to board a plane bound for an undetermined Arab country. The German authorities planned to ambush them there, but underestimated the number of terrorists and were thus undermanned. During a botched rescue attempt, all of the Israeli hostages were killed. Four of them were shot, then incinerated when one of the terrorists detonated a grenade inside the helicopter in which the hostages were sitting. The five remaining hostages were then machine-gunned by another terrorist.

Athletes from 48 NOCs won medals, leaving 73 NOCs unrepresented on the medal table. The Soviet Union edged the United States in total (99 to 94) and gold medals (50 to 33). Another notable rivalry took place between East and West Germany. Led by gymnast Karin Janz, who won two golds, two silvers and one bronze, East Germany (66 total and 20 gold medals) beat West Germany (13 gold and 40 total medals) to third place in the total medal count.  East Germany would nearly overtake the United States in 1976, and then finish second in the medal count in 1980 and 1988. American swimmer Mark Spitz won seven events, breaking the record for most gold medals by a single athlete in a single Olympic Games. Soviet gymnast Olga Korbut delivered another memorable performance. She entered the Olympics as an alternate on the Soviet gymnastics team, and replaced an injured teammate before the start of the competition.  Korbut performed magnificently during the team competition and captured the global television audience with her personality. She helped the Soviet team win its sixth straight Olympic title and went on to win two more individual gold medals and one silver.  Japanese gymnast Sawao Kato won three gold and two silver medals, including the men's individual all-around title.  This was the second individual all-around title for Kato, after 1968.  Kato would go on to take silver in the all-around competition in 1976 to cap an Olympic career medal total of eight golds, three silvers and one bronze.  Finnish runner Lasse Virén won both the 5,000 and 10,000 metre races.  The 10,000 metres was won in dramatic fashion after he recovered from a fall to win and set a world record.  He would repeat the double at the 1976 Games.

Medal table

The medal table is based on information provided by the International Olympic Committee (IOC) and is consistent with IOC convention in its published medal tables. By default, the table is ordered by the number of gold medals won by an NOC. The number of silver medals is taken into consideration next and then the number of bronze medals. If nations are still tied, equal ranking is given and they are listed alphabetically.

Medal changes

See also

 1972 Winter Olympics medal table

References

External links
 
 
 
 
 
 

Medal count
1972